Hacılı (also, Khodzhaly and Otsëlok Khodzhali) is a village and municipality in the Shamakhi Rayon of Azerbaijan.  It has a population of 337.

References 

Populated places in Shamakhi District